The 1954–55 New York Knicks season was the ninth season for the team in the National Basketball Association (NBA). In the regular season, the Knicks posted a 38–34 record and finished in second place in the Atlantic Division. New York qualified for its ninth consecutive NBA Playoffs, and lost in the best-of-three first round to the Boston Celtics, 2–1.

Offseason

NBA Draft

Note: This is not an extensive list; it only covers the first and second rounds, and any other players picked by the franchise that played at least one game in the league.

Roster

Regular season

Season standings

Record vs. opponents

Game log

Playoffs

|- align="center" bgcolor="#ffcccc"
| 1
| March 15
| @ Boston
| L 101–122
| Jim Baechtold (17)
| —
| Boston Garden
| 0–1
|- align="center" bgcolor="#ccffcc"
| 2
| March 16
| Boston
| W 102–95
| Nat Clifton (25)
| —
| Madison Square Garden III
| 1–1
|- align="center" bgcolor="#ffcccc"
| 3
| March 19
| Boston
| L 109–116
| Nat Clifton (21)
| Nat Clifton (6)
| Madison Square Garden III
| 1–2
|-

Awards and records
Harry Gallatin, All-NBA Second Team

References

New York Knicks seasons
New York
New York Knicks
New York Knicks
1950s in Manhattan
Madison Square Garden